Sufi Paranja Katha is a Malayalam-language film directed by Priyanandanan based on K. P. Ramanunni's novel with the same title. Ramanunni himself wrote the story, screenplay, and dialogues for the film. Thampi Antony, Prakash Bare, and Sharbani Mukherjee did the main roles in this film. The film has been distributed by Central Pictures. It is widely regarded as one of the defining movies of the Malayalam New Wave.

Plot
This film is a narrative by Sufi, a Muslim scholar.

Karthy belongs to a prestigious Hindu Tharavad. She falls in love with a Muslim trader named Mamootty and starts living in Mamootty's house after converting to Islam. But she doesn't give up her original beliefs of her original religion Hinduism. To save Karthy from the need to go to the temple, Mamootty builds one inside his house. When the local Muslim people learns of this, they create problems, causing the couple to move apart.

Cast

 Sharbani Mukherjee as Karthi, Suhara
 Thampi Antony as Sanku Menon
 Prakash Bare as Mamootty
 Jagathy Sreekumar as Avaru Musaliar
 V. K. Sreeraman as Saidu Mullah
 Babu Antony as Sufi
 Augustine as Putthan Adhikari
 Indrans as Velayi
 Irshad as Beeran
 Vineeth Kumar as Writer
 Mullanezhi as Vaidyar
 K. B. Venu as Kesava Menon
 Aliyar
 Samvrutha Sunil as Young woman at Jaram
 Hima Shankar as Parukutty
 Sona Nair as Beeyatthu
 Geetha Vijayan as Meenakshi
 Valsala Menon as Grandmother
 Sunitha Nedungadi as Ayisha

Writing
Ramanunni says he had no intention of making the novel into a film. But producer, Kalam Karasseri, had wanted to do a film based on it for years and Ramanunni complied. Ramanunni says he has not deviated much from the novel and wrote the script with a lot of care as it dealt with a sensitive theme. "In order to enhance cinematic effects, only one small portion of the story has been done away with and the anti-colonial sentiments have been highlighted. The dialogues of the film celebrate the co-existence of different religions," says Ramanunni.

Awards
It was one of three Indian films selected for International competition section of the 2010 edition of the International Film Festival of Kerala (IFFK). It won four Kerala State Film Awards.

 Kerala State Film Award for Best Cinematography - KG Jayan
 Kerala State Film Award for Best Lyrics - Rafeeq Ahammed (Thekkini Kolaaya)
 Kerala State Film Award for Best Music Director - Mohan Sithara (Thekkini Kolaaya)
 Kerala State Film Award for Best Processing - Chithranjali

Songs
The film has two songs written by Rafeeq Ahammed, with music by Mohan Sithara.
 "Thekkini Kolaaya Chumaril": K. S. Chithra, Sunil. Mohan Sithara won the 2009 Kerala State Film Award for Best Music Director and Rafeeq Ahammed the Kerala State Film Award for Best Lyrics for this song.
 "Saayam Sandhye Neerum Thiri Pol": Latha Krishna

References

External links

 Official website
 http://entertainment.oneindia.in/malayalam/reviews/2010/sufi-paranja-katha-review-230210.html
 http://www.nowrunning.com/movie/6219/malayalam/sufi-paranja-kadha/index.htm
 sify.com
 http://movies.rediff.com/report/2010/feb/22/south-movie-malayalam-review-sufi-paranja-katha.htm
 
 http://www.zonkerala.com/movie/sufi-paranja-katha-15.html

2010 films
2010s Malayalam-language films
Films based on Indian novels
Films directed by Priyanandanan
Films shot at Varikkasseri Mana